The chemical compound trichloroethylene (TCE) is a halocarbon with the formula C2HCl3, commonly used as an industrial solvent. It is a clear, colourless non-flammable liquid with a chloroform-like sweet smell. It should not be confused with the similar 1,1,1-trichloroethane, which is commonly known as chlorothene.

The IUPAC name is trichloroethene. Industrial abbreviations include TCE, trichlor, Trike, Tricky and tri.  It has been sold under a variety of trade names. Under the trade names Trimar and Trilene, trichloroethylene was used as a volatile anesthetic and as an inhaled obstetrical analgesic in millions of patients.

Groundwater and drinking water contamination from industrial discharge including trichloroethylene is a major concern for human health and has precipitated numerous incidents and lawsuits in the United States.

History
Trichloroethylene was discovered by Emil Fischer in 1864 by reduction of hexachloroethane with hydrogen. Commercial production began in Germany, in 1920 and in the US in 1925.

Pioneered by Imperial Chemical Industries in Britain, its development was hailed as an anesthetic revolution. Originally thought to possess less hepatotoxicity than chloroform, and without the unpleasant pungency and flammability of ether, TCE use was nonetheless soon found to have several pitfalls. These included promotion of cardiac arrhythmias, low volatility and high solubility preventing quick anesthetic induction, reactions with soda lime used in carbon dioxide absorbing systems, prolonged neurologic dysfunction when used with soda lime, and evidence of hepatotoxicity as had been found with chloroform.

The introduction of halothane in 1956 greatly diminished the use of TCE as a general anesthetic. TCE was still used as an inhalation analgesic in childbirth given by self-administration. Fetal toxicity and concerns for carcinogenic potential of TCE led to its abandonment in developed countries by the 1980s.

The use of trichloroethylene in the food and pharmaceutical industries has been banned in much of the world since the 1970s due to concerns about its toxicity. Legislation has forced the replacement of trichloroethylene in many processes in Europe as the chemical was classified as a carcinogen carrying an R45 risk phrase, May cause cancer. Many degreasing chemical alternatives are being promoted such as Ensolv and Leksol; however, each of these is based on n-propyl bromide which carries an R60 risk phrase of May impair fertility, and they would not be a legally acceptable substitute.

Production 
Prior to the early 1970s, most trichloroethylene was produced in a two-step process from acetylene. First, acetylene was treated with chlorine using a ferric chloride catalyst at 90 °C to produce 1,1,2,2-tetrachloroethane according to the chemical equation

HC≡CH + 2 Cl2 → Cl2CHCHCl2

The 1,1,2,2-tetrachloroethane is then dehydrochlorinated to give trichloroethylene. This can be accomplished either with an aqueous solution of calcium hydroxide

2 Cl2CHCHCl2 + Ca(OH)2 → 2 ClCH=CCl2 + CaCl2 + 2 H2O

or in the vapor phase by heating it to 300–500 °C on a barium chloride or calcium chloride catalyst

Cl2CHCHCl2 → ClCH=CCl2 + HCl

Today, however, most trichloroethylene is produced from ethylene. First, ethylene is chlorinated over a ferric chloride catalyst to produce 1,2-dichloroethane.

CH2=CH2 + Cl2 → ClCH2CH2Cl

When heated to around 400 °C with additional chlorine, 1,2-dichloroethane is converted to trichloroethylene

ClCH2CH2Cl + 2 Cl2 → ClCH=CCl2 + 3 HCl

This reaction can be catalyzed by a variety of substances. The most commonly used catalyst is a mixture of potassium chloride and aluminum chloride. However, various forms of porous carbon can also be used. This reaction produces tetrachloroethylene as a byproduct, and depending on the amount of chlorine fed to the reaction, tetrachloroethylene can even be the major product. Typically, trichloroethylene and tetrachloroethylene are collected together and then separated by distillation.

Uses 
Trichloroethylene is an effective solvent for a variety of organic materials.

When it was first widely produced in the 1920s, trichloroethylene's major use was to extract vegetable oils from plant materials such as soy, coconut, and palm. Other uses in the food industry included coffee decaffeination and the preparation of flavoring extracts from hops and spices. It has also been used for removing residual water in the production of 100% ethanol.

Anaesthesia
From the 1930s through the 1970s, both in Europe and in North America, trichloroethylene was used as a volatile anesthetic almost invariably administered with nitrous oxide. Marketed in the UK by ICI under the trade name Trilene it was coloured blue (with a dye called waxoline blue) to avoid confusion with the similar smelling chloroform.  TCE replaced earlier anesthetics chloroform and ether in the 1940s, but was itself replaced in the 1960s in developed countries with the introduction of halothane, which allowed much faster induction and recovery times and was considerably easier to administer.  Trilene was also used as a potent inhaled analgesic, mainly during childbirth.  It was used with halothane in the Tri-service field anaesthetic apparatus used by the UK armed forces under field conditions. As of 2000, however, TCE was still in use as an anesthetic in Africa.

Cleaning solvent
It has also been used as a dry cleaning solvent, although replaced in the 1950s by tetrachloroethylene (also known as perchloroethylene), except for spot cleaning where it is still used under the trade name Picrin.

Trichloroethylene was marketed as 'Ecco 1500 Anti-Static Film Cleaner and Conditioner' until 2009, for use in automatic movie film cleaning machines, and for manual cleaning with lint-free wipes.

Perhaps the greatest use of TCE has been as a degreaser for metal parts. The demand for TCE as a degreaser began to decline in the 1950s in favor of the less toxic 1,1,1-trichloroethane. However, 1,1,1-trichloroethane production has been phased out in most of the world under the terms of the Montreal Protocol, and as a result trichloroethylene has experienced some resurgence in use as a degreaser.

TCE has also been used in the United States to clean kerosene-fueled rocket engines (TCE was not used to clean hydrogen-fueled engines such as the Space Shuttle Main Engine).  During static firing, the RP-1 fuel would leave hydrocarbon deposits and vapors in the engine.  These deposits had to be flushed from the engine to avoid the possibility of explosion during engine handling and future firing.  TCE was used to flush the engine's fuel system immediately before and after each test firing.  The flushing procedure involved pumping TCE through the engine's fuel system and letting the solvent overflow for a period ranging from several seconds to 30–35 minutes, depending upon the engine.  For some engines, the engine's gas generator and liquid oxygen (LOX) dome were also flushed with TCE prior to test firing.  The F-1 rocket engine had its LOX dome, gas generator, and thrust chamber fuel jacket flushed with TCE during launch preparations.

Refrigerants
TCE is also used in the manufacture of a range of fluorocarbon refrigerants such as 1,1,1,2-tetrafluoroethane more commonly known as HFC 134a. TCE was also used in industrial refrigeration applications due to its high heat transfer capabilities and its low temperature specification. Many industrial refrigeration applications used TCE up to the 1990s in applications such as car testing facilities.

Safety

Chemical instability
Despite its widespread use as a metal degreaser, trichloroethylene itself is unstable in the presence of metal over prolonged exposure. As early as 1961 this phenomenon was recognized by the manufacturing industry, when stabilizing additives were added to the commercial formulation. Since the reactive instability is accentuated by higher temperatures, the search for stabilizing additives was conducted by heating trichloroethylene to its boiling point in a reflux condenser and observing decomposition. Definitive documentation of 1,4-dioxane as a stabilizing agent for TCE is scant due to the lack of specificity in early patent literature describing TCE formulations. Other chemical stabilizers include ketones such as methyl ethyl ketone.

Physiological effects
When inhaled, trichloroethylene produces central nervous system depression resulting in general anesthesia. These effects may be mediated by trichloroethylene acting as a positive allosteric modulator of inhibitory GABAA and glycine receptors. Its high blood solubility results in a less desirable slower induction of anesthesia. At low concentrations it is relatively non-irritating to the respiratory tract.  Higher concentrations result in tachypnea.  Many types of cardiac arrhythmias can occur and are exacerbated by epinephrine (adrenaline).  It was noted in the 1940s that TCE reacted with carbon dioxide (CO2) absorbing systems (soda lime) to produce dichloroacetylene and phosgene. Cranial nerve dysfunction (especially the fifth cranial nerve) was common when TCE anesthesia was given using CO2 absorbing systems.  Muscle relaxation with TCE anesthesia sufficient for surgery was poor. For these reasons as well as problems with hepatotoxicity, TCE lost popularity in North America and Europe to more potent anesthetics such as halothane by the 1960s.

The symptoms of acute non-medical exposure are similar to those of alcohol intoxication, beginning with headache, dizziness, and confusion and progressing with increasing exposure to unconsciousness.

Much of what is known about the human health effects of trichloroethylene is based on occupational exposures. Beyond the effects to the central nervous system, workplace exposure to trichloroethylene has been associated with toxic effects in the liver and kidney.

In 2023, research showed possible connections between TCE exposure and development of Parkinson's disease decades later. This correlation is difficult to prove, because of the long elapsed time between exposure and the development of symptoms.

Exposure and regulations 
Exposure to TCE occurs mainly through contaminated drinking water. With a specific gravity greater than 1 (denser than water), trichloroethylene can be present as a dense non-aqueous phase liquid (DNAPL) if sufficient quantities are spilled in the environment.

The first known report of TCE in groundwater was given in 1949 by two English public chemists who described two separate instances of well contamination by industrial releases of TCE. Based on available federal and state surveys, between 9% to 34% of the drinking water supply sources tested in the US may have some TCE contamination, though EPA has reported that most water supplies are in compliance with the maximum contaminant level (MCL) of 5 ppb.

Generally, atmospheric levels of TCE are highest in areas of concentrated industry and population. Atmospheric levels tend to be lowest in rural and remote regions. Average TCE concentrations measured in air across the United States generally between 0.01 ppb and 0.3 ppb, although mean levels as high as 3.4 ppb have been reported. TCE levels in the low parts per billion range have been measured in food; however, levels as high as 140 ppb were measured in a few samples of food.

Existing regulation in the United States and European Union 
Until recent years, the US Agency for Toxic Substances and Disease Registry (ATSDR) contended that trichloroethylene had little-to-no carcinogenic potential, and was probably a co-carcinogen—that is, it acted in concert with other substances to promote the formation of tumors.

State, federal, and international agencies classify trichloroethylene as a known or probable carcinogen. In 2014, the International Agency for Research on Cancer updated its classification of trichloroethylene to Group 1, indicating that sufficient evidence exists that it causes cancer of the kidney in humans as well as some evidence of cancer of the liver and non-Hodgkin's lymphoma.

In the European Union, the Scientific Committee on Occupational Exposure Limit Values (SCOEL) recommends an exposure limit for workers exposed to trichloroethylene of 10 ppm (54.7 mg/m3) for 8-hour TWA and of 30 ppm (164.1 mg/m3) for STEL (15 minutes).

Existing EU legislation aimed at protection of workers against risks to their health (including Chemical Agents Directive 98/24/EC and Carcinogens Directive 2004/37/EC) currently do not impose binding minimum requirements for controlling risks to workers' health during the use phase or throughout the life cycle of trichloroethylene.

Remediation
Recent research has focused on the in-place remediation of trichloroethylene in soil and ground water instead of removal for off-site treatment and disposal. Naturally-occurring bacteria have been identified with the ability to degrade TCE. Dehalococcoides sp. degrade trichloroethylene by reductive dechlorination under anaerobic conditions. Under aerobic conditions, Pseudomonas fluorescens can co-metabolize TCE. Soil and ground water contamination by TCE has also been successfully remediated by chemical treatment and extraction. The bacteria Nitrosomonas europaea can degrade a variety of halogenated compounds including trichloroethylene. Toluene dioxygenase has been reported to be involved in TCE degradation by Pseudomonas putida.

References

Further reading
 Agency for Toxic Substances and Disease Registry (ATSDR). 1997.   Toxicological Profile for Trichloroethylene.
 
 
 US Environmental Protection Agency  (USEPA). 2011.  Toxicological Review for Trichloroethylene
 US National Academy of Sciences (NAS). 2006. Assessing Human Health Risks of Trichloroethylene – Key Scientific Issues. Committee on Human Health Risks of Trichloroethylene, National Research Council.
 US National Toxicology Program (NTP). 2005. Trichloroethylene, in the 11th Annual Report of Carcinogens.

External links

 US EPA: Trichloroethylene – TCE information website – US Environmental Protection Agency (EPA)
 chlorinated-solvents.eu – Sustainable uses and industry recommendations, European Chlorinated Solvents Association
 Case Studies in Environmental Medicine: Trichloroethylene Toxicity – Agency for Toxic Substances and Disease Registry (ATSDR), of the US Department of Health and Human Services (public domain)
 Assessing Human Health Risks of Trichloroethylene – Key Scientific Issues – US National Academy of Sciences (NAS)
 US NIH: Eleventh Report on Carcinogens: Trichloroethylene Monograph – US National Institutes of Health (NIH)
 Workplace Safety and Health Topics: Trichloroethylene – TCE – US National Institute for Occupational Safety and Health (NIOSH)
 "EPA scientists found a toxic chemical damages fetal hearts. The Trump White House rewrote their assessment." by Elizabeth Shogren, Reveal, February 28, 2020

5-HT3 agonists
Chloroalkenes
Anesthetics
Carcinogens
GABAA receptor positive allosteric modulators
General anesthetics
Glycine receptor agonists
Halogenated solvents
Hazardous air pollutants
IARC Group 1 carcinogens
NMDA receptor antagonists
Sedatives
Soil contamination
Toxicology
Water pollution
Sweet-smelling chemicals